Miletus gopara is a butterfly in the family Lycaenidae. It is found in Southeast Asia.

Subspecies
 M. g. gopara (Thailand, Malaysian Peninsula, Tioman, Singapore, Sumatra, Java)
 M. g. artaxatus (Fruhstorfer, 1913) (Java)
 M. g. eustatius (Fruhstorfer, 1913) (Borneo)
 M. g. pardus Eliot, 1961 (Sumatra)

References

Butterflies described in 1890
Miletus (butterfly)
Butterflies of Singapore
Butterflies of Borneo